Calendar Girl is a female supervillain who debuted in The New Batman Adventures episode "Mean Seasons". Formerly a supermodel named Page Munroe, the character developed severe self-esteem issues and body dysmorphia after being fired by her agent when she turned 30 years old. Calendar Girl is portrayed as a physically-attractive woman with long black hair and a mask on her face; her motif is based in various annual holidays and combating ageism. She was voiced by Sela Ward and created by Paul Dini. Calendar Girl was a one-time character who failed to appear in any other DC Comics content, and is based on the character Calendar Man.

First appearance
Calendar Girl's first and only appearance occurs in The New Batman Adventures episode "Mean Seasons". She kidnaps a number of corporate figures who had previously hired her as supermodel Page Munroe. Her former agent reveals to Batman and Batgirl that she was fired rudely due to ageism when she turned 30 and was replaced by younger girls. Calendar Girl is stopped by Batman and Batgirl as she dresses up like the Grim Reaper for the Day of the Dead, attacking her hostages with a scythe. Detective Bullock tears her mask from her face, despite rumours that Page Munroe had botched plastic surgery and is physically hideous. Batgirl is shocked to see that Calendar Girl is still a beautiful woman, but Batman remarks that all she can see are her flaws as the woman writhes on the ground screaming, trying to cover her "ugly" face so nobody can see her.

Ageism commentary
Kyle Anderson of Nerdist noted during a review of "Mean Seasons" that the Calendar Girl character serves as an example of age discrimination and agism in fiction. Anderson stated, "the themes of aging not being a bad thing, and youth being overvalued, are constant in the episode. And this was very deliberate; actress Sela Ward voiced Calendar Girl and, at the time, she was conducting a protest campaign against Hollywood’s ageism and its harmful effects on public perception. Monroe is even said to have been marginalized simply because she turned 30, and Ward taking this role seems directly in line with her cause."

References

DC Comics female supervillains
Batman characters
DC Comics characters
Fictional models
Fictional kidnappers
Ageism in fiction
Ageing in fiction
Female characters in animated series
Female characters in animation
Female characters in comics
Characters created by Paul Dini